Ariadna Mingueza García (born 22 March 2003) is a Spanish footballer who plays as a defensive midfielder for Primera Federación club FC Barcelona B.

Club career
Mingueza started out as a footballer by playing for her hometown club, UCF Santa Perpetua, when she was eight years old. After two seasons, she joined Unió Deportiva Centelles, and during her first and only season in that club her performance attracted the attention of youth scouts at Barcelona who signed her up for their U-14 team (Infantil Alevín). From 2015 to 2021 Mingueza progressed through the different levels of the club's youth system until on 6 March 2021 she made her debut for the first team  in Primera División against Santa Teresa, replacing Jenni Hermoso on the 80th minutes of the game.

International career
Mingueza was first invited to train with Spain U-16 by Toña Is on 2 January 2018. She then became a regular name on the call-ups as well as later on U-17 national team which was also helmed by Is. In 2019 UEFA Under-17 Championship Mingueza was part of the Spain squad that reached the semi-final, but they were defeated by Netherlands and failed to reach the final for the first time since 2013.

Mingueza's first game for U-19 national team came during 2022 UEFA Championship qualification against Slovakia. She played the game in its entirety as the captain of Spain After 5 wins and 1 draw throughout two rounds with Mingueza playing in every game and 4 times in the starting line-up, Spain managed to qualify for the final tournament. She scored her first national youth team goal in a 6–0 victory against Portugal.

Personal life
Mingueza's older brother, Óscar was also a Barcelona player and presently plays for Celta de Vigo, and has joined La Masia in 2007.

References

External links
 
 Arianda Mingueza on Instagram
 Arianda Mingueza on Twitter

2003 births
Living people
People from Vallès Occidental
Sportspeople from the Province of Barcelona
Spanish women's footballers
Women's association football midfielders
Spain women's youth international footballers
Primera División (women) players
Sportswomen from Catalonia
Footballers from Catalonia
Segunda Federación (women) players
FC Barcelona Femení B players
FC Barcelona Femení players